Guillermo "Guille" Abascal Pérez (born 13 April 1989) is a Spanish professional football manager and former player who currently manages Russian club Spartak Moscow.

Having ended his professional career at 19 after being on the books of Barcelona and Sevilla, he began managing aged 28 with Chiasso in the Swiss Challenge League, and leading Lugano and Basel in the Swiss Super League. He also managed Ascoli in Serie B, Volos in the Super League Greece and Spartak Moscow in the Russian Premier League.

Club career

Early career
Born in Seville, Andalusia, Abascal joined FC Barcelona's La Masia in 2001, from hometown amateurs AD Heliópolis CF. He left the club in 2004, and finished his formation with Sevilla FC.

Abascal retired from professional football at the age of 18, and started studying at the Pablo de Olavide University in his hometown, while still representing amateurs UDE Abre and CD Aboño. He also spent a year at the University of Algarve, and returned to Sevilla in 2013 as a youth fitness coach. His first managerial experience came in 2016, when he took over Sevilla's Infantil B squad.

FC Chiasso
On 12 June 2017, Abascal moved abroad, being appointed manager of Swiss Challenge League side FC Chiasso. He made his professional debut ten days later in a 2–2 draw at Servette FC on the opening day of the season. Abascal was sacked on 4 April 2018, after suffering six defeats in his last eight matches. 

Six days later, he was named at the helm of Ticino neighbours FC Lugano in the Swiss Super League until the end of the season; he drew 1–1 at home to FC Thun in his first top-flight game. From being placed ninth and threatened with relegation, he led the club to eighth position, three points shy of the European qualification places.

Ascoli
In July 2019, Abascal was hired as manager for the Primavera squad (U19) of Italian club Ascoli Calcio 1898 FC. The following 27 January, Paolo Zanetti was dismissed as the head coach of the senior squad, and Abascal was appointed as caretaker manager. He won 3–0 in Serie B in his only game away to U.S. Livorno 1915 on 1 February. The next day, Roberto Stellone was hired and Abascal returned to his previous role; he came back to the first team on 16 April, after Stellone was dismissed. Following two defeats in two games in charge by the time the league season was resumed after the COVID-19 forced break, he was dismissed on 22 June.

Volos
In June 2021, Abascal was appointed at Super League Greece club Volos FC. He won four of his first five games, but was dismissed in December after six consecutive defeats.

FC Basel
Abascal came back to Switzerland's top flight at FC Basel on 21 February 2022, following the termination of Patrick Rahmen's contract. Despite coming second to FC Zürich in his interim spell, he was replaced by club icon Alexander Frei in May.

Spartak Moscow
On 10 June 2022, Abascal signed with Russian Premier League club FC Spartak Moscow. He beat eight other candidates to the two-year contract. The current Russian Cup holders were due to play in the UEFA Europa League but were barred due to the FIFA and UEFA response to the Russian invasion of Ukraine. 

His debut was on 9 July in a 4–0 Super Cup loss to Zenit St Petersburg. His first league game was a 1–1 away draw against Akhmat Grozny on 16 July. Abascal won his first match next week, on 23 July, in a 1–4 victory over FC Krasnodar. Spartak won their next three games and took the league lead after 5 games played on 14 August 2022. By the season's winter break in November, Spartak was second in the league table.

Managerial statistics

References

External links

SFL profile 

1989 births
Living people
Spanish footballers
Footballers from Seville
Association football forwards
Spanish football managers
FC Chiasso managers
FC Lugano managers
Ascoli Calcio 1898 F.C. managers
Volos FC managers
FC Basel managers
FC Spartak Moscow managers
Swiss Challenge League managers
Swiss Super League managers
Serie B managers
Super League Greece managers
Russian Premier League managers
Spanish expatriate football managers
Expatriate football managers in Switzerland
Expatriate football managers in Italy
Expatriate football managers in Greece
Expatriate football managers in Russia
Spanish expatriate sportspeople in Switzerland
Spanish expatriate sportspeople in Italy
Spanish expatriate sportspeople in Greece
Spanish expatriate sportspeople in Russia